Kadriorg Park is a park in Kadriorg, Tallinn, Estonia. Its area is about 70 ha.

The park history started in 1718, when Peter the Great ordered to re-designate his areas at Fonnenthal Summer Manor.

The park's most notable water body is Swan Pond.

The park's newest part is Japanese Garden, which first stage was ended in 2011.

References

External links
 

Parks in Tallinn